Myra Lillian Davis Hemmings (August 30, 1895 – December 8, 1968) was an American actress and teacher, and a founder of Delta Sigma Theta Sorority, Incorporated.

Early life
Hemmings was born in Gonzales, Texas to Henry and Susan (Dement) Davis. In 1909, she graduated from Riverside High School in San Antonio, Texas. At Howard University in Washington, D.C., Davis was a part of the group of seven who were newly initiated into the Alpha chapter of Alpha Kappa Alpha in 1912, where she was elected president. A dichotomy ensued between the combined 22 undergraduate Alpha chapter women and the newly graduated establishment of Alpha Kappa Alpha, with the younger women, led by Davis, becoming progressively more dissatisfied with the campus society-focused agenda of the sorority.

The seven along with the fifteen other members of the undergraduate Alpha chapter who voted to reorganize Alpha Kappa Alpha into a public service-centered organization and, after declining an ultimatum from a key dissenting graduated ΑΚΑ, formed Delta Sigma Theta. She was later named first president of Delta Sigma Theta's Alpha chapter. In 1913, Hemmings graduated from Howard University. After graduation, Davis began teaching in 1913 in San Antonio, Texas. In 1922 Davis married John W. Hemmings, a former actor on Broadway.

Acting
Hemmings was active in amateur theater and participated in the San Antonio Negro Little Theater by directing productions. She and her husband helped to organize Phyllis Wheatley Dramatic Guild Players. In her career, she appeared in three films. First, in the 1941 tragic drama film Go Down Death: The Story of Jesus and the Devil, she starred as the martyr Sister Caroline. In addition to acting, Hemmings co-produced and co-directed the film. In the 1943 film Marching On, she played Mrs. Ellen Tucker. In Girl in Room 20 (1946), she played Sarra Walker.

Later life
As a drama teacher, Hemmings directed plays from the 1920s to the 1950s at the Carver Community Cultural Center in San Antonio. Hemmings was elected as vice-president of Delta Sigma Theta in 1933 as well as the organization's historian in 1948. In 1947, Hemmings received her Master of Arts degree in speech from Northwestern University. Hemmings also continued to teach in San Antonio for fifty-one years. She was also a member of the NAACP, the National Council of Negro Women and the Alpha Phi Literary Society. Hemmings died in 1968 in San Antonio.

Tributes
After Hemmings' death, Dramatic Theatre Guild was renamed Myra Davis Hemmings Memorial Theatre Guild. In addition, the San Antonio alumnae chapter's of Delta Sigma Theta sorority resource center was named after Hemmings in 1986. Delta Sigma Theta Sorority, Inc. created the Myra Davis Hemmings Scholarship for the study in performance or creative arts.

See also
Delta Sigma Theta

References

External links

Handbook of Texas Online: Myra Hemmings
List of Myra Hemmings' films

African-American actresses
Howard University alumni
1895 births
1968 deaths
Actresses from San Antonio
African-American schoolteachers
Delta Sigma Theta founders
American stage actresses
American film actresses
20th-century American actresses
People from Gonzales, Texas
20th-century American educators
Schoolteachers from Texas
20th-century American women educators
20th-century African-American women
20th-century African-American educators